Dinah Mary Jefferies (born 1948) is a British novelist, and a short-story and article writer.

Biography
Dinah Jefferies was born in Malacca, Malaya in 1948 and moved to England in 1956 at age eight after the country became independent. She studied at the Birmingham College of Art and later at the University of Ulster, where she graduated in English literature.

When her son Jamie was fourteen he was killed in an accident at school and the experience went to underpinning the emotional power of her writings including her debut 2013 work The Separation.

Her 2015 novel, The Tea Planter's Wife , was a choice for the Richard and Judy Book Club. and was in the Sunday Times best sellers list for 16 weeks continuously from September until Christmas 2015, topping it twice during that time. Her next novel in 2016 novel, The Silk Merchant's Daughter, also entered the Sunday Times top 10. She has been a bestseller in Italy with both The Tea Planter's Wife and her 2017 book Before the Rains. The Sapphire Widow was published in April 2018. It too was a Richard and Judy Book Club pick for Summer 2018 and it also entered The Sunday Times Top 10 bestsellers list within 3 days of publication, staying there for three weeks. Her next book, The Missing Sister, was published in March 2019, though the eBook and Audio books were published a few weeks earlier. The eBook reached no 1 on the Amazon Kindle charts and the paperback entered the UK top 10 best sellers at no 8 after just three days of sales. She reached 13 in the Italian charts with that book. Having mainly based her books in South/South-East Asia, her 2020 book, The Tuscan Contessa, is set in Tuscany, Italy, during WW2. It was published in Italy and in the UK in July 2020.
Her books have been published in over 31 different languages. In September 2020 she changed publisher from Penguin Random House to HarperCollins UK, with a contract for a trilogy starting with Daughters of War, a story of three sisters in war torn Dordogne, France, during WW2. It was published on 16th September, 2021, and went straight into the Sunday Times top 10 selling paperbacks after three days of sales. The second part of the trilogy, The Hidden Palace, was published in September 2022 and is set in England, France and Malta over the period 1923 to 1947. The third volume of the trilogy, Night Train to Marrakech, is due August, 2023.

Bibliography
 2013 - The Separation
 2015 – The Tea Planter's Wife
 2016 – The Silk Merchant's Daughter 
 2017 – Before the Rains 
 2018 – The Sapphire Widow 
 2019 – The Missing Sister 
 2020 – The Tuscan Contessa
 2021 – Daughters of War
 2022 – The Hidden Palace
 2023 – Night Train to Marrakech

Short stories
"The Scent of Roses" (May 2014, published in The Sunday Express "S" magazine)
"The Shadow in the Wind" (Sept 2015, published in The Sunday Express "S" magazine)

References

External links
 
 Launching A Writing Career Later In Life at Writers & Artists

1948 births
British writers
Living people